Los Bacatranes is the debut album by Trebol Clan. It was released on June 29, 2004.

Track listing 

Trébol Clan albums
2004 albums
Albums produced by Luny Tunes
Albums produced by Nely